Research Triangle High School, commonly abbreviated RTHS, is a charter school with a STEM focus located in Research Triangle Park, North Carolina.  The school opened in August 2012 with an initial class of 160 freshmen, and now enrolls approximately 590 students in grades 9–12.

Academics
Research Triangle High School uses a personalized learning method. Students follow a mastery model for content learning and spend much of their time applying this knowledge in projects. This model is designed to develop the cognitive skills necessary to develop students into strong, self-directed learners who can not only get into college, but succeed in them as well.

The curriculum is aligned with the Common Core State Standards Initiative and the North Carolina Essential Standards.  All teachers at the school implement the Flipped Classroom method of recording lectures to be viewed by students outside of class, allowing for more hands-on instruction during class time. Students at RTHS learn to critically analyze sources and also share their research with others.

RTHS offers Advanced Placement courses in Biology, Calculus, Chemistry, Computer Science, Environmental Science, European History, English Language and Composition, English Literature and Composition, Spanish, Statistics, United States History, World History, and Psychology, as well as a college-level U.S. Government and Politics course.

Athletics
RTHS' athletics programs are known as the Raptors, and they compete in the 2A classification of the North Carolina High School Athletic Association.  RTHS entered the NCHSAA as a 1A member in 2014, and moved up to the 2A classification in 2021.

RTHS fields teams in boys' and girls' cross country, boys' and girls' soccer, boys' and girls' basketball, boys' and girls' track and field, boys' and girls' tennis, boys' and girls' swimming, boys' and girls'  golf, and girls' volleyball. With no athletic facilities on campus, RTHS partners with local organizations for practice and event space.

As of 2022, RTHS's athletic programs have captured 24 conference championships and two team state championships - boys' tennis (2019) and girls' cross country (2019), to go along with numerous individual state championships in tennis and track and field.

Controversy

The Durham County School Board and the Durham City Council had both previously voted to oppose the charter, citing concerns of lower-income accessibility. Proponents of the high school, however, explained that the school plans to target the area's diversity of race, gender, and economic background. A public forum held on February 13, 2012 allowed area residents to voice their opinions about the proposed charter. The response was generally positive. Despite Durham Public Schools' opposition, the school's charter was approved by the North Carolina State Board of Education on March 1, 2012.

Principals
 Eric Grunden (2012-2022)
 Chris Elliott (2022-present)

Notes

Public high schools in North Carolina
Educational institutions established in 2012
2012 establishments in North Carolina
Schools in Durham County, North Carolina
Charter schools in North Carolina